Aegista is a genus of air-breathing land snails, terrestrial pulmonate gastropod mollusks in the family Camaenidae.

Anatomy
Species within this genus create and use love darts as part of their mating behavior.

Distribution
This genus of snails is distributed throughout from Southeast Asia to temperate East Asia.

Species
Species within the genus Aegista include:
 
 Aegista accrescens
 Aegista aemula
 Aegista aperta
 Aegista araneaetela
 Aegista aubryana
 Aegista awajiensis
 Aegista bonnieri
 Aegista chinensis
 Aegista chondroderma
 Aegista conomphala
 Aegista coudeini (Bavay & Dautzenberg, 1900)
 Aegista crassiuscula
 Aegista delectabilis
 Aegista diplogramme
 Aegista diversifamilia C.-W. Huang, Y.-C. Lee, S.-M. Lin & W.-L. Wu, 2014
 Aegista fausta Kuroda & Habe, 1951
 Aegista fauveli (Bavay & Dautzenberg, 1900)
 Aegista elegantissima
 Aegista friedeliana
 Aegista fulgens
 Aegista fulvicans
 Aegista gerlachi
 Aegista hachijoensis
 Aegista hakusanensis M. Azuma & Y. Azuma, 1982
 Aegista hebes (Pilsbry & Hirase, 1905)
 Aegista herpestes
 Aegista hiroshifukudai Hirano, Kameda & Chiba, 2016
 Aegista horrida
 Aegista inermis
 Aegista inexpectata
 Aegista inornata
 Aegista inrinensis
 Aegista intonsa
 Aegista kantori Thach & F. Huber, 2021
 Aegista kiusiuensis
 Aegista kobensis
 Aegista kunimiensis M. Azuma & Y. Azuma, 1982
 Aegista laoyelingensis Zhang, 1993
 Aegista lasia (Pilsbry & Y. Hirase, 1909)
 Aegista lautsi (Schmacker & O. Boettger, 1890)
 Aegista laurentii (Gredler, 1887)
 Aegista lepidophora
 Aegista mackensii (A. Adams & Reeve, 1850) : synonym of Plectotropis mackensii (Adams & Reeve, 1850)
 Aegista marginata
 Aegista martensiana
 Aegista mimula
 Aegista minima
 Aegista oculus
 Aegista oldhami (Benson, 1859)
 Aegista omma (Pilsbry & Y. Hirase, 1904)
 Aegista onae Thach & F. Huber, 2021
 Aegista omiensis (Pilsbry, 1901): synonym of Plectotropis omiensis (Pilsbry, 1902)
 Aegista packhaensis
 Aegista pannosa
 Aegista permellita
 Aegista perplexa
 Aegista platyomphala
 Aegista radleyi
 Aegista scepasma
 Aegista serpestes
 Aegista squarrosa (A. Gould, 1859)
 Aegista stenomphala Minato, 2003
 Aegista shikokuensis
 Aegista stephanieclarkae Thach & F. Huber, 2021
 Aegista squarrosa
 Aegista subchinensis
 Aegista subinflexa
 Aegista tapeina
 Aegista tokunoshimana
 Aegista tokyoensis
 Aegista trichotropis
 Aegista trochula
 Aegista vermis
 Aegista visayana
 Aegista vulgivaga

References

 List of species at: 
 Taxonomy at: 
 Bank, R. A. (2017). Classification of the Recent terrestrial Gastropoda of the World. Last update: July 16, 2017.

External links
 Albers, J. C. (1850). Die Heliceen nach natürlicher Verwandtschaft systematisch geordnet. Berlin: Enslin. 262 pp.

 
Camaenidae
Taxonomy articles created by Polbot
Gastropod genera